The Battle of Istabulat was a part of the Samarra offensive during the First World War occurring when the British Empire attempted to further its strategic position after the capture of Baghdad from the Ottoman Empire.

Background 
After capturing Baghdad, British General Frederick Stanley Maude believed the British position was threatened by the Ottoman forces of Khalil Pasha, who possessed 10,000 troops to the north of Baghdad, and Ali Ishan Bey's force who commanded 15,000 troops entering the region from Persia. In order to protect British gains in the region, in particular Baghdad, General Maude ordered the Samarrah Offensive. To maintain British control of Baghdad, Maude outlined four objectives that needed to be met: Pasha's 6th Army needed to be driven north, the 8th Corps moving to join the 6th Army must be driven away or destroyed, the rail yard at Samarrah must be captured to prevent an Ottoman buildup of troops and munitions, and the British must secure the dams around Baghdad so that the Ottomans could not break them and flood the area.

Prelude 
The main British force advanced along both sides of the Tigris river. On 17 April, the British pushed the Ottomans out of their trenches on the Adhaim river. This was a successful operation for the British as they suffered few casualties while capturing 1,200 Ottoman soldiers. On 18 April, the Black Watch pushed forward a patrol along the east bank of the Dujail scouting the Ottoman position at Istabulat. The 28th Punjabis did the same on the west bank. On 19 April, the Black Watch Battalion drove the enemy advance troops back with little loss. During the night the British built three strong posts a mile in advance, two on the east and one on the west bank of the Dujail. The Ottomans felt it was needed to contest this advance as if the rail yard at Samarrah was lost the Ottomans would lose to ability to bring in reinforcements effectively to the region.

Battle of Istabulat 
The assault on the Ottoman position at Istabulat started on the morning of 21 April with the 92nd Punjabis advancing on Istabulat station. They successfully took the position by assault and dug themselves in in front of the main position, half a mile beyond the Ottoman trenches. At 6.30 a.m. the Black Watch and Gurkhas reached the foot of the high ridge, where the enemy lay waiting for the assault. The Gurkhas and Black Watch reached their objectives almost at the same moment. The Gurkhas took nearly 200 prisoners in the north redoubt, where the enemy's resistance was not as heavy as elsewhere. But in the Dujail Redoubt the Turks resistance was more effective. The Black Watch had cleared this strong point at 6.45 a.m. The Turks quickly reorganized their forces and counter-attacked. Through this attack they reoccupied the greater part of the position. They were pushed out of the position by the Highlanders at 7.15 a.m. The redoubt firmly returned to British hands. The Highlanders paid a heavy price losing 10 officers and 173 enlisted in this engagement. The Ottomans ordered several counterattacks along the banks of the Dujail, and it was not until after 2 hours of hand to-hand fighting that the north bank was secured by the British. The 9th Bhopals attempted a flanking movement but overshot their objective and came under fire from the banks of the Dujail. Two hundred fell, including heavy casualties among the officers. South of the canal one company of the 28th Punjabis advanced in line with the 21st (Bareilly) Brigade. The Seaforths on their left launched their attack some three hours later and drove the enemy from his first-line trench. The intention in pressing in first on the right with the 21st Brigade was to give the Ottomans a line of retreat to the left to distract his attention as much as possible from the troops who had to advance over more open ground. But the Ottoman position held out all day, and it was not until early on the morning of the 22nd that the Ottomans withdrew from their position.

Aftermath 
Turkish forces were forced to surrender the Samarrah Rail Yard to British forces, ending their chance of retaking a dominant strategic position in the region. At the Battle of Istabulat, each side suffered approximately 2,000 killed. British casualties in the Sammarrah offensive as a whole were estimated at around 18,000 men, although a further 37,000 men were lost to sickness. The Ottoman Empire lost about 15,000 men in the campaign, destroying the Ottoman 6th army. Two Victoria Cross were awarded to John Reginald Graham and Charles Melvin for their actions at Istabulat.

Resources

Further reading
Barker, A. J. The Bastard War: The Mesopotamian Campaign of 1914-1918. New York: Dial Press, 1967. 

Istabulat
Istabulat
Istabulat
Istabulat
Istabulat
Istabulat
April 1917 events